Batman Petrolspor is a professional Turkish football club located in the city of Batman. Formed in 1960, the club colours are red, white, and black and they play their home matches at Batman Arena. The club is named Petrolspor because Batman is the largest producer of oil in Turkey.

History
Batman Petrolspor was founded in 1960 with several branches including athletics, basketball, football, swimming, volleyball, and wrestling. The club played amateur football in the Diyarbakır regional leagues until 1986 when they won promotion to the 3.Lig. The club won promotion to the 2.Lig soon after and competed in the division for several years.

They have never won promotion to the Süper Lig, falling in the 2.Lig promotion semi-finals to Göztepe. The club were relegated to the 3.Lig at the conclusion of the 2005–06 season, and have competed in the division since then. Their greatest success in the Turkish Cup came in 1977 when they reached the fourth round, losing to Kocaelispor 3–0 on aggregate. At the time, Batman Petrolspor were still competing in the Turkish Regional Amateur League.

Stadium
The club plays its home matches at Batman Arena. The stadium seats 15,000 spectators and is covered by grass. The club previously played its home matches at the 16 Mayıs Stadium.

Noted players
Batman Petrolspor have produced Orhan Kapucu, a Batman native, and Ozan İpek, both capped by the Turkey national football team. Kapucu went on to play for several clubs, most notably Fenerbahçe. He earned his solitary cap in a Euro 1988 qualifying match against Northern Ireland on 12 November 1986. İpek currently plays for Bursaspor, winning the 2009-10 Süper Lig. He earned his first cap for the Turkey national football team in a friendly match against Honduras on 3 March 2010.

Current squad

References

External links
Official website
Batman Petrolspor on TFF.org

 
Association football clubs established in 1960
Sport in Batman, Turkey
Football clubs in Turkey
1960 establishments in Turkey